Maria Johanna von Aachen (born Maria Johanna Katharina Erika Elisabeth von Amboten; 21 April 1755  – 21 January 1845) was a Westphalian writer and noblewoman.

Life
Maria Johanna Katharina Erika Elisabeth von Aachen was born in Vechta, a midsized strongly Catholic town in the flatlands between Osnabrück and Bremen.   Majors Lewin Friedrich von Ambotten, her father, was in the service of the archbishops of Münster.   He came, originally, from the Kurland region in what has subsequently become part of Latvia.

In 1777 she married Captain Klemens August von Aachen (1756-1808), a career soldier in the Prussian Army and, like herself, a writer.   It is known that the marriage resulted in the births of (at least) four children From the time she married, Maria Johanna wrote poetry.   However, she did not see herself as a career poet, and most of her published poems appeared pseudonymously, publication having been arranged by other people.   Maria Johanna died three months short of what would have been her ninetieth birthday, and was comfortably predeceased not just, in 1808, by her husband, but also by both her sons and by one of her two recorded daughters.   It is therefore unsurprising that her work is characterised by a certain spirit of melancholy.

She became a strong backer of the newspaper producer and anthologist Friedrich Raßmann, and a member of the literary circle around Elisa von Ahlefeldt and Elise Rüdiger.   She features frequently in the published correspondence of Annette von Droste-Hülshoff, in whose one-act comedy "Perdu!" the character of Mrs von Austen is a supposed by some to be caricature of Maria Johanna von Aachen.

Maria Johanna von Aachen died at Münster on 21 January 1845, having spent more than the final three decades of her life as a widow.

Select Bibliography

References

German women writers
German nobility
1755 births
1845 deaths
People from Vechta